Sean P. Keating (July 14, 1903 – July 2, 1976) was an Irish Republican Army member who opposed the Anglo-Irish Treaty and later became Deputy Mayor of New York City and Regional Director of the United States Post Office.

Keating was born and raised in Kanturk, County Cork, Ireland. He was a volunteer in the Irish Republican Army during the Irish War of Independence and fought for the Anti-Treaty Forces against the Irish Free State during the Irish Civil War. He moved to the United States, where he advocated for Irish nationalist causes and for British withdrawal from Northern Ireland. He was involved in Democratic Party politics and a close associate of Irish-American political activist Paul O'Dwyer and his brother, New York City Mayor William O'Dwyer. Keating was involved in the campaigns of President John F. Kennedy and Senator Robert F. Kennedy.   

Keating left school at the age of 13 to join the Irish Volunteers, which later became the IRA, serving in the 4th Cork Brigade. He was arrested by British troops in November 1920 and beaten.
 He was interned in Ballykinlar internment camp until December 1921, where he participated in several hunger strikes. Following his release, he opposed the Anglo-Irish Treaty and served in the Fianna Cork 4th Brigade on the Republican side under Sean Moylan during the Irish Civil War.

Keating emigrated to New York City in 1927 and became involved in Irish cultural organizations and Democratic party politics. He was a founder of American Friends of Irish Neutrality, which opposed Irish involvement in World War II, ostensibly fearing it would result in British re-occupation of Ireland. 

Following World War II, he was chairman of the executive council of the 1947 Irish Race Convention  and president of the American League for an Undivided Ireland, lobbying in support of the Fogarty Amendment, which unsuccessfully attempted to tie the release of Marshall Plan funds to British withdrawal from Northern Ireland. 

Between the 1940s and 1960s, he served as president of the County Corkmen Association, president of the United Irish Counties Association, and president of the Irish Institute. In 1956, he served as Grand Marshal of the New York City St. Patrick's Day Parade.
 
Keating served in various positions under New York City mayors William O'Dwyer, Vincent Impellitteri, and Robert F. Wagner, Jr., rising to the position of Deputy Mayor, under Wagner. He was reportedly the first to publicly introduce future President Kennedy as "the next President of the United States" at an Irish Institute event in 1957. He was appointed Regional Director of the U.S. Post Office by President Kennedy and served in that position from 1961 until his retirement in 1966. 

Following President Kennedy's assassination, he served as National Chairman of the President Kennedy Memorial Committee, which secured the lands and raised the funds for the John F. Kennedy Arboretum in New Ross, County Wexford, Ireland. 

In retirement, he returned to Kanturk and continued to advocate for the reunification of Ireland. Keating died at his retirement home in Kanturk in 1976 and is buried there.

References

Notes

Sources
"Next Irish-born Mayor of New York", Irish Digest (July 1957)
Interview with Sean P. Keating, Columbia University Oral History Department, January 24, 1974
"Sean Keating - An Appreciation", Irish Echo, July 17, 1976
"Donald Maria O'Callaghan, O'Carm.: Politician and Pastor", Steven D. Kennedy, 1990

Politicians from New York City
Irish Republican Army (1919–1922) members
People of the Irish Civil War (Anti-Treaty side)
Irish republicans interned without trial
Politicians from County Cork
1976 deaths
People from Kanturk
1903 births